Demas Bluff is a rock bluff on the south side of the Fosdick Mountains, 2 nautical miles (4 km) west of Mount Richardson, in the Ford Ranges of Marie Byrd Land. It was mapped by the United States Antarctic Service (USAS) (1939–41) under Rear Admiral Richard E. Byrd, and was named for Dr. Charles J. Demas who provided medical assistance and supplies for the Byrd Antarctic Expedition (1933–35) and for USAS (1939–41).

References

Cliffs of Marie Byrd Land